The Croton Distributing Reservoir, also known as the Murray Hill Reservoir, was an above-ground reservoir at 42nd Street and Fifth Avenue in the New York City borough of Manhattan. Covering  and holding , it supplied the city with drinking water during the 19th century. Atop the walls was a public promenade offering panoramic views; Edgar Allan Poe enjoyed walking there.

When established, the Croton Aqueduct was New York City's foremost water source. Construction began in May 1837 and filling began July 4, 1842 amidst great fanfare. Prior to construction of the aqueduct, water was obtained from cisterns, wells and barrels from rain. The aqueduct and reservoir obtained their names from the water's source, a series of mostly underground conduits that would bring water from the Croton River in northern Westchester County to New York City's spigots.

Demolition

The reservoir was torn down in the 1890s. Today, the Main Branch of the New York Public Library, located in the eastern portion of Bryant Park, stands at that location. Some of the reservoir's original foundation can still be found in the South Court at the Main Branch. Today water is primarily supplied to New York City via its three city water tunnels. The decommissioned Central Park Reservoir still remains, but has not operated as part of the Croton Aqueduct system since 1993.

Subway commuters can see historical photographs showing the former reservoir. The display is located on the wall in the underground passageway that connects the Fifth Avenue station on the New York City Subway's IRT Flushing Line and the 42nd Street–Bryant Park station on the IND Sixth Avenue Line. A few years before the reservoir was torn down, there were two tablets affixed to the Reservoir. The inscription was:

HISTORICAL AND DESCRIPTIVE ACCOUNT OF THE CROTON AQUEDUCT – The Law authorizing the construction of the work, passed May 2nd, 1834. Stephen Allen, William W. Fox, Saul Alley, Charles Dusenberry and Benjamin M. Brown were appointed Commissioners. During the year 1834, two surveys were made—one by DAVID B. DOUGLASS and the other by JOHN MARTINEAU. In April, 1835, a majority of the Electors of the City voted in favour of constructing the Aqueduct. On the 7th May following, the _Common Council_ "instructed the Commissioners to proceed with the work." David B. Douglass was employed as Chief Engineer until October, 1836; when he was succeeded by John B. Jervis. In March, 1837, Benjamin M. Brown resigned, and was succeeded by Thomas T. Woodruff. In March, 1840, the before mentioned Commissioners were succeeded by Samuel Stevens, John D. Ward, Zevedee Ring, Benjamin Birdsall and Samuel R. Childs. The work was commenced in May, 1837. On the 22nd June, 1842, the Aqueduct was so far completed that it received the Water from the Croton River Lake; on the 27th the Water entered the Receiving Reservoir and was admitted into this Reservoir on the succeeding 4th of July. The DAM at the Croton River is 40 feet high, and the overfall 251 feet in length. The CROTON RIVER LAKE is five miles long, and covers an area of 400 acres. The AQUEDUCT, from the DAM to this Reservoir, is 40½ miles long, and will deliver in twenty-four hours 60,000,000 imperial gallons. The capacity of the Receiving Reservoir is 150,000,000 gallons, and of this reservoir 20,000,000. The cost, to and including this Reservoir, nearly $9,000,000.

The second tablet stated:

CROTON AQUEDUCT – DISTRIBUTING RESERVOIR – COMMISSIONERS:

   SAMUEL STEVENS
   ZEBEDEE RING
   JOHN D. WARD
   BENJn BIRDSALL
   SAMUEL R. CHILDS

ENGINEERS:

   JOHN B. JERVIS. CHIEF.
   Ho ALLEN, PRINl ASSIST.
   P. HASTIE, RESIDENT.

BUILDERS:

   THOMSON PRICE & SON.

COMMENCED A. D. MDCCCXXXVIII.

COMPLETED A. D. MDCCCXLII.

References

External links

 Manhole Cover in the Water System

Buildings and structures demolished in 1899
Reservoirs in New York (state)
Fifth Avenue
Water infrastructure of New York City
Reservoirs in Manhattan
42nd Street (Manhattan)
Former reservoirs
Bryant Park